FLCCC may refer to:

 Front Line COVID-19 Critical Care Alliance, a controversial U.S medical organization founded in 2020
 Foot Locker Cross Country Championships